Jan Stehlík may refer to:

 Jan Stehlík (basketball) (born 1986), Czech basketball player
 Jan Stehlík (handballer) (born 1985), Czech handball player
 Jan Stehlík (wrestler), Czech Olympic wrestler